Eugenio Merello (born 12 March 1940) is an Italian former water polo player. He competed at the 1964 Summer Olympics and the 1968 Summer Olympics.

See also
 Italy men's Olympic water polo team records and statistics
 List of men's Olympic water polo tournament goalkeepers

References

External links
 

1940 births
Living people
Italian male water polo players
Water polo goalkeepers
Olympic water polo players of Italy
Water polo players at the 1964 Summer Olympics
Water polo players at the 1968 Summer Olympics
Water polo players from Genoa